Donald Frank Rose (June 29, 1890 – February 7, 1964) was an American newspaper columnist, lecturer, and author.

Biography

Early life and education
Rose was born on June 29, 1890 to Frank Hodson Rose and Mary Anne Harriette Searle Rose, in Street, Somerset, England. He later observed that it was a good place to be born an Englishman, as his birthplace on Wilfred Terrace was but three miles from Glastonbury Tor.  At age 14, he went to work as a clerk at a brewery in Surrey, until the time of his emigration to the United States in 1908. While working at the brewery, however, he got a foretaste of what would eventually become his long-term profession.  At the age of seventeen, he entered an essay contest run by the English magazine The Reader.  And for his speculations on what the world would be like in the year 2000, he won a prize of two dollars and fifty cents.

The plan in going to America was that he should study to become a minister in the New Church, as his great-grandfather, the Rev. James Shirley Hodson, had been before him. He crossed the Atlantic in the Autumn of 1908 on the USS Saint Paul, but he was seasick and singularly unimpressed with the seaworthiness of the vessel. He professed himself unsurprised that the ship capsized while docking in New York ten years later.

The path to the ministry entailed finishing his secondary education the Academy of the New Church Secondary Schools, receiving an undergraduate degree at the affiliated college, and then continuing into the Theological School. After two years of study for the ministry, he gave up that ambition, as he later liked to say, "for the good of the church." At that point he turned instead to teaching and writing to support his growing family; for on June 13, 1914, he had married Marjorie Wells and over the next 17 years they had twelve children. One of his 86 grandchildren is New York Times culture critic Neil Genzlinger.

Career

Rose began his career teaching high school English while he was a still himself a student in theological school.  In 1915 he added Latin to his teaching responsibilities. By 1916, he was giving instruction in Hebrew as well. During his years of teaching, he pursued additional education at Columbia and Oxford University.  He continued teaching until 1924, at which point he launched out on his own as a freelance writer.

He began publishing his own magazine, Stuff and Nonsense, in 1925, with lighthearted and humorous reflections on the challenges of day-to-day life. He also wrote articles for The American, Cosmopolitan, Saturday Evening Post, and a number of other magazines.

In 1927, "Stuff and Nonsense" became a weekly column for the Sunday Public Ledger (Philadelphia). Eventually, at about the time that the morning and Sunday editions merged with the Philadelphia Inquirer, the column went to daily in the Evening Public Ledger.  When the latter ceased publication in 1942, Rose's column moved to The Philadelphia Bulletin, during the period when the Bulletin was the largest afternoon daily in the country. "Stuff and Nonsense" appeared on the Op-Ed page and Rose was also sometimes called on to write unsigned editorials on the editorial page itself. He continued his column at the Bulletin until the time of his death. Between 1927 and 1951, he published 8 books, several of them being collections of his newspaper columns.

At the end of World War II, he was sent by the Bulletin to survey the aftermath of the destruction.  This resulted in a number of columns and his book Diary of a Postwar Correspondent. What he saw left him shaken, and his wife observed that this experience weakened him for rest of his life.

In his later years, Rose taught journalism courses at Columbia, Penn State, Temple University, and the Charles Morris Price School of Advertising and Journalism.

Rose died on February 7, 1964 at Meadowbrook, Pennsylvania.

Bibliography

By Rose

Books
Stuff and Nonsense. 1927.
Wings of Tomorrow The Story of The Autogiro, (with Juan De La Cierva). New York: Brewer, Warren & Putnam, 1931.
Hardy Perennial. 1937.
Mother Nature Knows Best. Philadelphia, Westbrook Publishing Co., 1940.
My Own Four Walls. New York, Doubleday, Doran & Co., 1941.
Mr. Wicker's War. Macrae-Smith Co. Philadelphia 1943.
The Diary of a Postwar Correspondent. Bryn Athyn, PA, 1945.
Full House. Philadelphia, J. B. Lippincott Co., 1951.
Leary's of Philadelphia. c.1964.

Articles
"Table Talk: The Pessimism of Protoplasm," Forum: The Magazine of Controversy, Vol. 80, no. 3, September 1928.
"This Book Collecting Game," North American Review, February 1929, pp. 248–250.
"The Great American Editorial," Forum: The Magazine of Controversy, Vol. 82, no. 5, November 1929.

About Rose
 Genzlinger, Neil, The Reread Rose, 1990

References

External links 
 A website with letters between Rose and his wife 

1890 births
1964 deaths
American columnists